The 1982 U.S. National Indoor Championships was a men's tennis tournament played on indoor carpet courts that was part of the 1982 Volvo Grand Prix. It was the 12th edition of the tournament and was played at the Racquet Club of Memphis in Memphis, Tennessee in the United States from February 8 through February 14, 1982. Eighth-seeded Johan Kriek won the singles title and earned $40,000 first-prize money.

Finals

Singles
 Johan Kriek defeated  John McEnroe 6–3, 3–6, 6–4
 It was Kriek's 1st singles title of the year and the 5th of his career.

Doubles
 Kevin Curren /  Steve Denton defeated  Peter Fleming /  John McEnroe 7–6, 4–6, 6–2

References

External links
 ITF tournament edition details

U.S. National Indoor
U.S. National Indoor Championships
Carpet court tennis tournaments
Indoor tennis tournaments
Tennis tournaments in the United States
U.S. National Indoor Tennis Championships
U.S. National Indoor Tennis Championships
U.S. National Indoor Tennis Championships